Clyde River is a  community in the Canadian province of Nova Scotia, located in the Shelburne municipal district of Shelburne County. It borrows its name from the Clyde River which flows through the community, which was in turn adopted from the famous Scottish river. The area was settled by New England Planters about 1667 and later by Loyalists after 1783. Lumbering and farming were the initial industries. In 1847 there were 15 Mi'kmaq families living in the Clyde River area.

See also
 List of communities in Nova Scotia

References

 

Communities in Shelburne County, Nova Scotia
General Service Areas in Nova Scotia